Henri François Anne de Roussel (11 July 1748, Saint-Bômer-les-Forges – 17 February 1812, Caen) was a French naturalist.

He studied humanities and philosophy at the University of Caen, obtaining the rank of "maître ès-arts" in 1767. Afterwards he studied medicine in Caen, relocating to Paris in 1771, where he furthered his education. In 1773 he was appointed to the chair of medicine at Caen, where in 1786, he attained the chair of medical botany. Later on, he served as a professor of experimental physics and chemistry at the École centrale du Calvados.

Principal works 
 Tableau des plantes usuelles rangées par ordre : suivant les rapports de leurs principes et de leurs propriétés, 1792 - Table of conventional plants, arranged in order according to reports of their principles and properties.
 Flore du Calvados et terreins adjacents, 1796 - Flora of Calvados and adjacent areas.
 Élémens de chymie et de physique expérimentale : à l'usage des Écoles centrales de Calvados, 1798 - Elements of chemistry and experimental physics, as utilized at the Écoles centrales du Calvados.

Taxa 
 Gymnopus (Persoon) Roussel, 1806 (family Marasmiaceae). 
 Mycena (Persoon) Roussel, 1806 (family Mycenaceae).

References 

1748 births
1812 deaths
Academic staff of the University of Caen Normandy
University of Caen Normandy alumni
People from Orne
French naturalists
French mycologists
19th-century French botanists
18th-century French botanists